Ennis is a town in Madison County, Montana, United States, in the southwestern part of the state.  The population was 917 at the 2020 census.

U.S. Route 287 runs through town, following the Madison River as it descends from the town of West Yellowstone.

History

In 1863, gold was discovered in Alder Gulch. This brought on "the rush." Two months later, William Ennis homesteaded the site along the Madison River that was soon to become the town of Ennis, his namesake.

In 1886, a mystery creature was noted for making livestock kills in the Madison Valley. A local rancher, Israel Ammon Hutchins, finally shot and killed the beast, after accidentally shooting one of his cattle, which was on the other side of some brush. A local taxidermist stuffed the canine. Jack Kirby (Hutchins' Grandson) tracked the mount to a Museum in Pocatello, Idaho, circa 2007.

Avid Aircraft, a manufacturer of homebuilt aircraft, was located in Ennis. The company ceased operations in 2003.

The 2003 Ennis shootings took place on June 14 of that year, when 44-year-old George Harold Davis opened fire outside the Silver Dollar Saloon bar on Main Street. He killed one man and injured six others. He then fled to Missoula County, where he was finally stopped and arrested by police. He was sentenced to eleven life terms for the crime.

Geography
The town is flanked by Tobacco Root Mountains to the northwest, the Gravelly Range to the southwest and the Madison Range to the east. A large "E" has been placed in a hill west of the town at this location: 

Climate
According to the Köppen Climate Classification system, Ennis has a warm-summer humid continental climate, abbreviated Dfb"" on climate maps.

Demographics

2010 census
As of the census of 2010, there were 838 people, 416 households, and 207 families residing in the town. The racial makeup of the town was 96.9% White, 0.1% African American, 0.8% Native American, 0.2% Asian, 0.5% from other races, and 1.4% from two or more races. Hispanic or Latino of any race were 1.9% of the population.

There were 416 households, of which 20.4% had children under the age of 18 living with them, 36.8% were married couples living together, 9.9% had a female householder with no husband present, 3.1% had a male householder with no wife present, and 50.2% were non-families. 42.5% of all households were made up of individuals, and 20.4% had someone living alone who was 65 years of age or older. The average household size was 1.91 and the average family size was 2.60.

The median age in the town was 49.8 years. 15.8% of residents were under the age of 18; 6% were between the ages of 18 and 24; 22.2% were from 25 to 44; 30.7% were from 45 to 64; and 25.3% were 65 years of age or older. The gender makeup of the town was 49.4% male and 50.6% female.

2000 census
As of the census of 2000, there were 840 people, 367 households, and 219 families residing in the town. The population density was 1,240.2 people per square mile (476.9/km2). There were 434 housing units at an average density of 640.8 per square mile (246.4/km2). The racial makeup of the town was 97.98% White, 0.48% from other races, and 1.55% from two or more races. Hispanic or Latino of any race were 0.71% of the population.

There were 367 households, out of which 27.2% had children under the age of 18 living with them, 46.9% were married couples living together, 9.5% had a female householder with no husband present, and 40.1% were non-families. 36.0% of all households were made up of individuals, and 11.2% had someone living alone who was 65 years of age or older. The average household size was 2.20 and the average family size was 2.87.

In the town, the population was spread out, with 24.3% under the age of 18, 5.7% from 18 to 24, 23.0% from 25 to 44, 26.3% from 45 to 64, and 20.7% who were 65 years of age or older. The median age was 43 years. For every 100 females there were 90.9 males. For every 100 females age 18 and over, there were 94.5 males.

The median income for a household in the town was $30,735, and the median income for a family was $38,542. Males had a median income of $30,956 versus $16,875 for females. The per capita income for the town was $17,310. About 7.7% of families and 11.9% of the population were below the poverty line, including 10.9% of those under age 18 and 11.7% of those age 65 or over.

Economy
Ennis is the center of a long-standing ranching economy in the Madison River Valley. Large cattle and sheep ranches dot the valley north and south of the town along the river. Ennis is also a major tourist attraction and angling destination for fly fisherman targeting rainbow and brown trout. The small town hosts at least three fly shops and numerous resorts that cater to fly anglers with guided fishing trips on the Madison and in nearby Yellowstone National Park. Ennis is home to Willie's Distillery, known for its bourbon and moonshine, and one of the growing number of micro-distilleries in Montana.

Education
Ennis Schools educates students from kindergarten through 12th grade. Ennis High School's team name is the Mustangs.

Ennis has a public library, the Madison Valley Public Library.

Arts and culture

The Ennis Chamber of Commerce has organized an annual 4th of July parade since the early 1980s. In 2014, the Chamber hosted its 79th annual Fourth of July parade. The annual parade down main street in Ennis attracts visitors from throughout the U.S. and is considered one of the best small town parades in Montana.  The 4th of July celebration in Ennis includes a rodeo event at the Ennis Rodeo Grounds just west of town.  For at least the last decade, the Madison River Foundation, headquartered in Ennis has sponsored an annual 'Ennis on the Madison' Fly Fishing Festival in mid August.  The festival attracts anglers and fly fishing luminaries from around the U.S.  Each summer, Ennis hosts three long distance runs, collectively known as the Madison Trifecta.  A duathlon is held over the 4th of July weekend between Ennis and Virginia City, Montana. A full marathon, the highest elevation run (over ) in America is held in the Gravelly Range in late July.  The Madison Triathlon is held in August of every year between Ennis and Harrison, Montana.  In October, the Chamber of Commerce also hosts the annual Hunters Feed. It takes place the day before rifle season opens.  Locals line up on Main St. and cook a wild game dish for the attendees to sample.  In the past there has been elk, moose, deer, pheasant, and bob cat to try. A winner is chosen for the best chili, best non-chili dish, and most unusual dish.  Ennis is also home to Montana's first combined brewery and distillery festival, Tap Into Ennis.  The event occurs the third Saturday in May which coincides with the first day of fishing season on the Madison River.  The Chamber hosts the event and invites Montana breweries and distilleries, artists, and local music acts. Ennis also hosts the Madison Valley Arts Festival, typically the second Saturday of August.

Infrastructure
Ennis is served by the Big Sky Airport.

In popular culture
 The plot of Steven Seagal's film The Patriot was set in this town.
 Ennis was featured on an episode of Haunted Highway in 2012.

Wildlife restoration
In 2012, a few miles south of Ennis, in restored wetlands along O'Dell spring creek and the Madison River, Montana Department of Fish, Wildlife and Parks and the Montana Audubon Society undertook a project to reintroduce trumpeter swans to the Madison Valley.  In August 2012, five trumpeter swan cygnets were released in restored wetlands.  The goals of the project are to establish at least five breeding pairs of trumpeter swans through annual releases over five years.

References

External links
 Ennis official website
 Ennis Chamber of Commerce

Towns in Madison County, Montana